Wolf Like Me is a streaming television comedy-drama series produced by Stan in association with NBCUniversal and Peacock. It premiered on both streaming services on 13 January 2022. In April 2022, Peacock renewed the series for a second season.

Plot
Gary (Josh Gad) is a single father living in Adelaide, Australia with his 11-year-old daughter Emma; both of whom are still emotionally traumatized by the death of Emma's mother, Lisa, 7 years earlier. They meet Mary (Isla Fisher), an isolated advice columnist recovering from her own complex emotional baggage. But despite her attempts to stay away, they keep meeting again and again, in a cluster of coincidences that imply the hand of destiny. While Gary struggles to connect to his daughter, for Mary reaching Emma is all but effortless. However, Mary's baggage involves a deadly secret that she fears might hurt the two.

Cast

Main
 Isla Fisher as Mary
 Josh Gad as Gary
 Ariel Donoghue as Emma

Recurring
 Emma Lung - Sarah, Gary's sister-in-law
 Anthony Taufa - Ray, Sarah's partner
 Alan Dukes - Trevor, Emma's Psychiatrist

Guest
 Jake Ryan
 Robyn Nevin
 Nash Edgerton
 Emily Barclay

Episodes

Production
The six-part series was produced by Jodi Matterson, Bruna Papandrea and Steve Hutensky. It was written by Abe Forsythe, who also directed all 6 episodes. In April 2021 it was announced that Isla Fisher and Josh Gad would star in the series. In December further cast members were announced with Ariel Donoghue, Emma Lung and Anthony Taufa, and guest roles for Jake Ryan, Robyn Nevin and Nash Edgerton. The series was filmed in the Inner West of Sydney in the suburbs of Forest Lodge, Glebe, Ashfield and Ashbury, Western Sydney, Menai, Sutherland and regional NSW. On 26 April 2022, Peacock renewed the series for a second season.

Release & reception
On 4 January 2022, a trailer was released, with it being described as "genre-bending." The series released all six 30-minute episodes on Peacock and Stan on 13 January 2022.

The series became available to view in Canada on Amazon Prime on 12 January 2022.

Overall, the series has been met by a positive reception. Metacritic, based on 8 reviews, assigned the first season a rating of 69 out of 100, indicating "generally favorable reviews". Rotten Tomatoes gave the Season 1 a 65% critical approval rating and an average rating of 6.3/10 based on 20 reviews, though filtering for "Top Critics" the score rose to 75%. Stating that the Critic's Consensus of, "Wolf Like Me's mixed bag of occasionally disparate elements takes time to gel, but Isla Fisher and Josh Gad make it easy to be patient."

References

External links
 
 
 
 

English-language television shows
Stan (service) original programming
Television series about werewolves
2022 American television series debuts
2022 Australian television series debuts
Television shows set in Australia
Television shows filmed in Australia
Peacock (streaming service) original programming